An E chart, also known as a tumbling E chart, is an ophthalmological chart used to measure a patient's visual acuity.

Uses

This chart is useful for patients who are unable to read the Latin alphabet – for example, very young children.  It is also used in countries where people do not use the alphabet in their native language – for example, in China.

It contains rows of the letter "E" in various kinds of rotation. The patient is asked to state (usually by pointing) where the limbs of the E are pointing, "up, down, left or right." Depending on how far the patient can "read", his or her visual acuity is quantified. It works on the same principle as Snellen's distant vision chart.

See also 
 Visual acuity
 Landolt C

References

Ophthalmology